This refers to an incumbent member of the Indian parliament. For the former chief minister of Madras state, see C.N Annadurai.

Annadurai C N is an Indian politician.  He was elected to the Lok Sabha, lower house of the Parliament of India from Tiruvannamalai, Tamil Nadu in the 2019 Indian general election as member of the Dravida Munnetra Kazhagam.

References

External links
 Official biographical sketch in Parliament of India website
Dravida Munnetra Kazhagam politicians
Living people
1973 births
India MPs 2019–present